Suichang County is a county under the jurisdiction of Lishui City, in the southwest of Zhejiang Province, China, bordering Fujian province to the southwest.

History
Suichang is known as the place where Tang Xianzu wrote his most famous play The Peony Pavilion in the 16th century. Tang served as Suichang County's top official for three years and left behind many legendary stories which are still passed on from generation to generation. Today's Suichang County has joined modern society with many vehicles, highways connecting it to the capital city of Hangzhou, and renowned for its bamboo forests and natural scenery such as White Horse Mountain (Bai Ma Shan) and Nine Dragon Mountain (Jiu Long Shan) which recorded as one of the sites where wild humans were said to be present in the 1950s and 1960s.

Administrative divisions
Towns:
Miaogao (妙高镇), Yunfeng (云峰镇), Beijie (北界镇), Dazhe (大柘镇), Shilian (石练镇), Jinzhu (金竹镇), Huangshayao (黄沙腰镇), Xinluwan (新路湾镇), Wangcunkou (王村口镇)

Townships:
Jiaotan Township (焦滩乡), Yingcun Township (应村乡), Hushan Township (湖山乡), Lianzhu Township (濂竹乡), Gaoping Township (高坪乡), Caiyuan Township (蔡源乡), Longyang Township (龙洋乡), Xifan Township (西畈乡), Ankou Township (垵口乡), Zhedaikou Township (柘岱口乡), Sanren She Ethnic Township (三仁畲族乡)

Climate

References

External links
 http://www.suichang.gov.cn/

County-level divisions of Zhejiang
Lishui